The Russell Sackett House is a single family home located at 1604 Court Street in Saginaw, Michigan. It was listed on the National Register of Historic Places in 1982.

History
The lot on which this house stands was owned by a series of land speculators from 1835 to 1895. In 1899, Russell Sackett bought the land and had a home constructed for his family. Sackett was a traveling salesman who settled in Saginaw. After Sackett left, the house was owned by a clothing merchant, the later a real estate agent and a lawyer. The last two owners converted the house for use as an office.

Description
The Russell Sackett House is a two-story Queen Anne home with Shingle Style elements. It has irregular massing, with a second story over-hang, extended gable ends, and two-sided bays. Many of the windows have small panes above a larger rectangular panes. Shingle Style elements of the design include a restrained use of ornamentation, and a lower, sweeping roofline.  At one time, the house had a large wraparound porch which was removed and replaced with a small pediment roof supported by narrow pillars.

References

		
National Register of Historic Places in Saginaw County, Michigan
Queen Anne architecture in Michigan
Shingle Style architecture in Michigan
Houses completed in 1889